Hypopachus barberi (common names: Barber's sheep frog, montane sheep frog) is a species of frog in the family Microhylidae.
It is found in El Salvador, Guatemala, Honduras, and Mexico. This species is found in humid pine-oak forests at the elevations of  asl.
It is threatened by habitat loss due to logging.

References

B
Frogs of North America
Amphibians of El Salvador
Amphibians of Guatemala
Amphibians of Honduras
Amphibians of Mexico
Taxonomy articles created by Polbot
Amphibians described in 1939